German submarine U-901 was a Type VIIC U-boat of Nazi Germany's Kriegsmarine during World War II.

She was ordered on 10 April 1941, and was laid down on 1 January 1942 at Stettiner Maschinenbau AG, Stettin, as yard number 14. She was launched on 9 October 1943 and commissioned under the command of Oberleutnant zur See Hans Schrenk on 29 April 1944.

Design
German Type VIIC submarines were preceded by the shorter Type VIIB submarines. U-901 had a displacement of  when at the surface and  while submerged. She had two shafts and two  propellers.

U-901 was fitted with five  torpedo tubes (four fitted at the bow and one at the stern), fourteen torpedoes or 26 TMA mines, one  SK C/35 naval gun, (220 rounds), one  Flak M42 and two twin  C/30 anti-aircraft guns. The boat had a complement of between 44 — 52 men.

Service history
U-901  participated in one war patrol that yielded no ships sunk or damaged.

On 15 May 1945, U-901 surrendered at Stavanger, Norway. She was later transferred to Lisahally, on 27 May 1945. Of the 156 U-boats that eventually surrendered to the Allied forces at the end of the war, U-901 was one of 116 selected to take part in Operation Deadlight. U-901 was towed out and sank on 5 January 1946 by unknown causes.

References

Bibliography

External links

German Type VIIC submarines
U-boats commissioned in 1944
World War II submarines of Germany
Ships built in Stettin
1943 ships
World War II shipwrecks in the Atlantic Ocean
Operation Deadlight
Maritime incidents in 1946